The women's freestyle 55 kilograms is a competition featured at the 2021 World Wrestling Championships, and was held in Oslo, Norway on 4 and 5 October.

This freestyle wrestling competition consists of a single-elimination tournament, with a repechage used to determine the winner of two bronze medals. The two finalists face off for gold and silver medals. Each wrestler who loses to one of the two finalists moves into the repechage, culminating in a pair of bronze medal matches featuring the semifinal losers each facing the remaining repechage opponent from their half of the bracket.

Each bout consists of a single round within a six-minute limit including two halves of three minutes. The wrestler who scores more points is the winner.

Tsugumi Sakurai from Japan won the gold medal after dominating Nina Hemmer from Germany in the final, Sakurai won the match by technical superiority 10–0. Oleksandra Khomenets of Ukraine and Jenna Burkert from the United States shared the bronze medals. Khomenets beat Olga Khoroshavtseva from the Russian Wrestling Federation and Jenna Burkert beat Pinki from India in their bronze medal matches.

Results
Legend
F — Won by fall

Main bracket

Repechage

Final standing

References

External links
Official website

Women's freestyle 55 kg
2021 in women's sport wrestling